WBKK (820 AM) is a radio station licensed to Wilton, Minnesota, serving the Bemidji market area. The station airs a Catholic talk format as an owned and operated affiliate of Real Presence Radio.

It's 10,000 watt transmitter and towers are located south of Bemidji, on Trout Haven Road, near Lake Plantagenet.

The station was assigned the WBKK call letters by the Federal Communications Commission on May 14, 2008.

FM translator
On June 8, 2018, Real Presence Radio bought a construction permit for 98.7 MHz, suggesting an FM translator would be operating soon. The translator, K254DJ, received its broadcast license on December 14, 2021.

History
It debuted in October 2012, with a mostly news-talk format. The station aired CBS Radio News, local news and weather reports. Syndicated talk shows, including Laura Ingraham, The Common Sense Club (radio talk show from Fargo, North Dakota), and Jason Lewis were weekday features. Locally originated Oldies were broadcast on the weekends. The station was originally owned by De La Hunt Broadcasting of Park Rapids, Minnesota and licensed to Edward De la Hunt, Sr. The station was sold to Real Presence Radio of Grand Forks, ND effective October 19, 2015, at a purchase price of $225,000.

References

External links

News and talk radio stations in the United States
Radio stations established in 2012
Christian radio stations in Minnesota